Wife! Be Like a Rose!  Kimiko is a 1935 Japanese comedy drama film directed by Mikio Naruse. It is based on the shinpa play Futari tsuma (二人妻, lit. Two Wives) by Minoru Nakano and one of Naruse's earliest sound films. Wife! Be Like a Rose! was one of the first Japanese films to see a theatrical release in the United States.

Plot
Kimiko, a young modern Tokyo woman, lives alone with her poetress mother Etsuko. Etsuko still grieves for her former husband Shunsaku, who left the family for ex-geisha Oyuki fifteen years ago, although Kimiko remembers their marriage not as a happy one. The only contact between Shunsaku, Etsuko and his daughter are money orders without personal messages he sends them. Kimiko travels to the countryside to talk Shunsaku into returning to the family, as her boyfriend Seiji's father wants to meet him before giving his admittance to Kimiko's and Seiji's marriage. Contrary to her expectations, Shunsaku is happy with his new wife and their two children, and Oyuki turns out to be a warm-hearted person instead of the calculating woman Kimiko was sure to meet. Not only does she support her husband, whose business is going badly, but it is also she, not Shunsaku, who is sending the money to Etsuko and Kimiko. Shunsaku agrees to go to Tokyo with Kimiko, but after a short discordant time spent with his ex-wife, he returns to Oyuki and his children, while Kimiko finally accepts that the past can't be reversed.

Cast
 Sachiko Chiba as Kimiko Yamamoto
 Heihachirō Ōkawa as Seiji, Kimiko's boyfriend
 Yuriko Hanabusa as Oyuki
 Tomoko Itō as Etsuko, Kimiko's mother
 Setsuko Horikoshi as Shizuko, Oyuki's daughter
 Chikako Hosokawa as Shingo's wife
 Sadao Maruyama as Shunsaku, Kimiko's father
 Kaoru Itō as Kenichi, Oyuki's son
 Kamatari Fujiwara as Shingo, Etsuko's brother

Production and legacy
Naruse had joined P.C.L. studios (soon to merge into Toho) only the year before, unhappy with the working conditions at his former studio Shochiku. Wife! Be Like a Rose! received the 1936 Kinema Junpo Award as Best Film of the Year and opened in New York in 1937 under the title Kimiko. Film historians have since emphasised the film's "sprightly, modern feel" and "innovative visual style" and "progressive social attitudes".

References

External links
 
 
 
 

1935 films
1935 comedy-drama films
1930s Japanese-language films
Japanese comedy-drama films
Japanese films based on plays
Films directed by Mikio Naruse